Macrosiphoniella is a genus of Aphids of the family Aphididae. The genus was described by Giacomo del Guercio in 1911.  There are at least 150 described species in Macrosiphoniella.

See also
 List of Macrosiphoniella species

References

Sternorrhyncha genera
Macrosiphini